Ngozi Eucharia Uche (born 18 June 1973 in Mbaise, Imo State, Nigeria) is a former football player and a former head coach of the Nigeria women's national football team. Uche grew up in Owerri, Nigeria.

Early life 
The first of five children, she was brought up in a middle class environment. She attended the Egbu Girls Secondary School Owerri before heading to Delta State University. While in secondary school, Uche began playing soccer. She later played for the national team Super Falcons, and became their first female coach. In 2010, she became the first woman coach to win an African Women's Championship title. She was sacked in October 2011 after Nigeria failed to qualify for the 2012 Summer Olympics.

Controversy
Uche was cautioned by FIFA for remarks she made during the 2011 FIFA Women's World Cup, in which she called homosexuality a "dirty issue" and "spiritually wrong".

Honours
 Nigeria
Coach
African Women's Championship Winner (1): 2010

References

External links 
 
Official Website of the Nigeria Football Federation
Nigeria at the FIFA website.
 Nigeria at CAF Online

1973 births
Living people
Sportspeople from Imo State
Nigeria women's international footballers
2011 FIFA Women's World Cup managers
Female association football managers
1991 FIFA Women's World Cup players
1995 FIFA Women's World Cup players
Nigerian women's footballers
Nigeria women's national football team managers
Women's association football forwards
People from Mbaise
Nigerian football managers
 Igbo people